The 1984–85 American Indoor Soccer Association season was the inaugural season of the AISA. The league began with six teams, all based in the Midwest. Canton won the regular season by five games. Lesh Shkreli of Columbus ran away with the scoring title, and also won the MVP vote. Canton coach Klaas de Boer took home Coach of the Year honors. Louisville upset Columbus with a semifinals-sweep, and faced Canton in the finals. In the championship round, the Invaders handled the Thunder in four games.

League Standings

Playoffs

League Leaders

Scoring

Goalkeeping

League awards
Most Valuable Player: Lesh Shkreli, Columbus 
Coach of the Year: Klaas de Boer, Canton 
Defender of the Year: Oscar Pisano, Canton 
Goalkeeper of the Year: Rick Schweizer, Louisville

All-AISA Teams

References

External links
Major Indoor Soccer League II (RSSSF)
1985 in American Soccer

1985 in American soccer leagues
1986 in American soccer leagues
1984-85